TF Carrier was a train ferry introduced by the Edinburgh & Northern Railway, later incorporated into the North British Railway, to cross the River Tay as part of its route between Edinburgh and Aberdeen.

History

Scotland

Launched in 1858, the Carrier was the third and smallest vessel in a fleet of six train ferries introduced by Thomas Bouch, the engineer of the ENR/NBR, to carry the company's trains across the Forth and Tay estuaries.  Bouch was not only responsible for their design but also that of the linkspans and associated equipment.  The ferries carried goods wagons and, occasionally, empty passenger coaches.  The passengers themselves crossed by conventional paddle steamers.

She was powered by two oscillating cylinder steam engines, each developing . She had two tracks on her deck each capable of handling 7 wagons.

Initially allocated to the Tay crossing she was transferred to the Forth crossing along with her sister ship Robert Napier when Bouch's ill-fated Tay Bridge opened in June 1878.  When that structure collapsed on 28 December 1879, Robert Napier returned to the Tay to re-establish the link but Carrier remained at Granton.

Isle of Wight

By 1883 Carrier was surplus to requirements at Granton and was sold to The Isle of Wight Railway Marine Transit Company which wished to establish a ferry service between Langstone station on the LB&SCR's Hayling Island Branch and St Helens station on the Bembridge branch on the island. The service commenced in 1885.  The following year the TF Carrier was hired to the London, Brighton and South Coast Railway due to the IoWMTC's financial state.  However the Carrier was ill-suited to the exposed waters of the Solent and the service ceased in 1888 and the ship sold for scrap.

References

1858 ships
Ferry transport on the Isle of Wight
Steamships of the United Kingdom
Merchant ships of the United Kingdom
Ships of the London, Brighton and South Coast Railway
Ships of the Isle of Wight Railway